Archibald Blake McCoig (April 8, 1873 – November 21, 1927) was a Canadian politician.

Born in Tilbury East, Ontario, the son of Daniel McCoig, a Scottish immigrant, he was elected as a Liberal candidate to the Legislative Assembly of Ontario for the provincial riding of Kent West in the 1905 election. In 1908, he was elected to the House of Commons of Canada for the federal riding of Kent West. A Liberal, he was re-elected in 1911, 1917, and 1921. In 1922, he was called to the Senate of Canada representing the senatorial division of Kent, Ontario to allow James Murdock, the Minister of Labour, to take his seat. He served until his death in 1927.

McCoig married Adele M. Demarse in 1898. He served on the Chatham town council.

References 
 Canadian Parliamentary Guide, 1912, EJ Chambers

External links
 
 

1873 births
1927 deaths
Canadian senators from Ontario
Liberal Party of Canada MPs
Ontario Liberal Party MPPs
Liberal Party of Canada senators
Members of the House of Commons of Canada from Ontario